The 1992 P&G Taiwan Women's Open was a women's tennis tournament played on outdoor hard courts at the Taipei City Courts in Taipei, Taiwan that was part of the Tier V category of the 1992 WTA Tour. It was the fifth edition of the tournament and was held from 25 September through 4 October 1992. Unseeded Shaun Stafford won the singles title and earned $18,000 first-prize money.

Finals

Singles
 Shaun Stafford defeated  Ann Grossman 6–1, 6–3
 It was Stafford's only singles title of her career.

Doubles
 Jo-Anne Faull /   Julie Richardson defeated  Amanda Coetzer /  Cammy MacGregor 7–5, 6–3
 It was Faull's 1st doubles title of the year and the 2nd of her career. It was Richardson's only doubles title of the year and the 7th and last of her career.

References

External links
 ITF tournament edition details 
 Tournament draws

Taipei Women's Championship
Taipei Women's Championship
Taipei Women's Championship, 1992